Robert Rainey may refer to:

 Robert M. Rainey (1882–1971), judge in Oklahoma
 Robert Wayne Rainey (born 1966), director, photographer and artistic community activist
 Robert E. L. Rainey (1914–2002), American artist, art educator and advertising executive

See also
Robert Rainie (1860–1945), Scottish rugby union player
Robert Rainy (1826–1906), Scottish Presbyterian divine